Carbon dioxide scrubbing may refer to:

 Carbon dioxide scrubber, a device that absorbs carbon dioxide
 Carbon capture and storage, the capture of carbon dioxide from large point sources
 Carbon dioxide removal, the removal of carbon dioxide from ambient air